The Stream is a reality television singing competition franchise that premiered in 2016. First aired on Norwegian TV 2, the concept started in Norway, but has been sold to the United States, where NBC will make the American version of it in the near future.

Format 
The show's format has five stages of competition. The first is the auditions, which is online. In 3 months the contestants can upload their online audition on the internet. The 100 contestants with most streams, will get a ticket to a showcase. The "Showcase" is the second stage. It's actually here the filming of the show begins. The three biggest record labels, Sony Music, Warner Music and Universal Music, are sending an artist from the label, who will present them as one of the three judges and artist developer. When the contestants has performed in front of the three judges, they will vote in which the contestants are going home or going to the workshop. The "Workshop" is where the contestants on short time, is going to work together. When they performed together, the judges will pick which contestants who's going to the second last stage. When the contestants are down to fifteen, they will each performer one last time for an audience. After that, each record label will pick 3 contestants, they want to sign with. The nine contestants who has signed with one of the three record labels, will perform the next week on the final stage. The "Liveshows" are the final stage, where each week they will release a cover on Spotify. In the end, the contestant with most streams, will be crowned the winner. The prize is a ticket to a showcase in Los Angeles, where the winner will get a chance, to become an international artist.

Season 1 (2016)

Finalists 
Key:
 – Winner
 – Runner-up
 – Eliminated

Live shows 
The live shows began on October 14, 2016.

Week 1: Opening (14 October)

Week 2 (21 October)

Week 3 (28 October)

Week 4 (4 November)

Week 5 (11 November)

Week 6 (18 November)

Week 7 (25 November)

Week 8 (2 December)

Week 9: Finale (10 December)

Overall 
Artist's info

Result details

Versions 
 Franchise with a currently airing season
 Franchise with an upcoming season
 Franchise that had ceased to air

Awards and nominations

External links

References 

Norwegian reality television series
2016 Norwegian television series debuts
2010s Norwegian television series
Talent shows